United Nations Security Council Resolution 1730, adopted unanimously on December 19, 2006, after emphasising the role of sanctions, the Council requested the Secretary-General to establish a focal point within the Secretariat to ensure "fair and clear" procedures for placing individuals and entities on sanctions lists and for removing them.

Resolution

Observations
Reaffirming the importance of sanctions in maintaining international peace and security, the Council urged all Member States to implement obligations placed upon them. It wanted to ensure that sanctions were targeted in support of clear objectives and implemented fairly, as well as having humanitarian exceptions.

Acts
The Security Council adopted a de-listing procedure provided in the annex of the resolution. Sanctions committees established in resolutions 751 (1992),  918 (1994), 1132 (1997), 1267 (1999), 1518 (2003), 1533 (2004), 1572 (2004), 1591 (2005), 1636 (2005) and 1718 (2006) were asked to revise their guidelines accordingly.

De-listing procedure
The Secretary-General was asked to establish a focal point within the Secretariat to receive requests for de-listing. The focal point was to receive petitions for de-listing which would then be forwarded on to the governments of the individual's residence. It de-listing is approved, rejected or no action is taken by the relevant governments, the Committee would be informed in all instances and if necessary, approve or reject the application. The petitioner would then be informed of the decision.

See also
 List of United Nations Security Council Resolutions 1701 to 1800 (2006–2008)

References

External links
 
Text of the Resolution at undocs.org

 1730
 1730
December 2006 events